Bonikowski or Bońkowski is a Polish language surname. It may refer to:

Bart Bonikowski, American sociologist
Joe Bonikowski (born 1941), American former baseball pitcher 

Polish-language surnames